Miles Tackett is a musician and producer. He founded Breakestra.

Biography

Miles Tackett grew up in the Santa Monica Mountains of Topanga Canyon. His father is Fred Tackett, the multi-instrumental member of 70s American rock band Little Feat.
While in his teens, Miles co-formed the band The Inclined and in 1993 they released Bright New Day (Columbia). In 1999, Breakestra released the Miles Tackett produced & composed his first deep funk track "Getcho Soul Togetha" on Stones Throw Records which featured him on drums, bass & guitar along with Mixmaster Wolf on vocals. A full length Breakestra record “the Live Mix tape part 2” on Stones Throw soon followed. A few years later after securing a deal with Ubiquity Records Miles composed, produced, and played on Breakestra's Hit the Floor which included all-original songs. Tackett and Breakestra appear on the soundtrack for the 2005 Tony Hawk's American Wasteland video game. In late 2009, Breakestra led by Miles Tackett put together the full-length CD, Dusk Till Dawn, which featured guest rapper Chali 2na.

Discography

Solo Projects:

  The Fool Who Wonders (The Root Down, Los Angeles) 2014
 Out Of Time Out Of Mind (Global Muse, Japan) 2007

Miles Tackett Produced Albums:
 ‘’ The Fool Who Wonders’’ (Root Down) 2014
  Dusk Till Dawn (Strut Records) 2009
  Hit The Floor (Ubiquity Records) 2005	
  The Live Mix Part 2 (Stones Throw Records) 2000
  Live Mix Part 1 (Stones Throw Records) 1998

Miles Tackett Produced EPs:
  Joyful Noise (Strut Records) 2009
  Stand Up (Ubiquity Records) 2006
 ‘’ Ring of Fire ‘’ Johnny Cash/June Carter Cover (45 only)2004
 ‘’ Deuces Up Double Down’’ 45 single 2001
  Yesterdays New Quintet / Breakestra / Mr Dibbs* - Suite For Weldon (Stones Throw Records) 2003
  Remember Who You Are • Cramp Your Style • Baby Don't Cry (Rapster Records) 2001
 Dj Music Man Miles mixes 
 ‘’Funky Sole Vol.1’’ 2003

References

External links 
 Miles Tackett Discography at Discogs

Stones Throw Records artists
Ubiquity Records artists